The cuneiform sign ši, lim, and Sumerogram IGI is a common-use sign of the Amarna letters, the Epic of Gilgamesh, and other cuneiform texts. As the syllabic form it is commonly used for ši, lim/lem, and for Sumerograms (capital letter majuscules), it is most commonly used for IGI (Akkadian language pānu, for English language "face", "presence"), and (with prep.) "before". Also, for ši and lim/lem it can be used syllabically for š, i, l, i/e, and m, in the spelling of words.

Epic of Gilgamesh usage
The ši sign usage in the Epic of Gilgamesh is as follows: lem-(2) times, lim-(25), ši-(299), IGI-(15), ŠI-(1) time.

References

Moran, William L. 1987, 1992. The Amarna Letters. Johns Hopkins University Press, 1987, 1992. 393 pages.(softcover)
 Parpola, 1971. The Standard Babylonian Epic of Gilgamesh, Parpola, Simo, Neo-Assyrian Text Corpus Project, c 1997, Tablet I thru Tablet XII, Index of Names, Sign List, and Glossary-(pp. 119–145), 165 pages.

Cuneiform signs